Anthracini is a tribe of bee flies in the family Bombyliidae.

Genera
Anthrax Scopoli, 1763
Brachyanax Evenhuis, 1981
Dicranoclista Bezzi, 1924
Satyramoeba Sack, 1909
Spogostylum Macquart, 1840
Thraxan Yeates & Lambkin, 1998
Turkmeniella Paramonov, 1940
Walkeromyia Paramonov, 1934
Xenox Evenhuis, 1985

References

Bombyliidae
Diptera tribes